Thanyaburi may refer to:
Thanyaburi District, Pathum Thani province, Thailand
Thanyaburi Town, town in Thanyaburi district